Chika Kato (born 28 February 1994) is a Japanese professional footballer who plays as a midfielder for WE League club Chifure AS Elfen Saitama.

Club career 
Kato made her WE League debut on 12 September 2021.

References 

Japanese women's footballers
Urawa Red Diamonds Ladies players
Chifure AS Elfen Saitama players
Association football people from Saitama Prefecture
1994 births
Living people
Women's association football midfielders
WE League players